The 2013 Virginia lieutenant gubernatorial election took place on November 5, 2013, to elect the Lieutenant Governor of Virginia. The incumbent Lieutenant Governor, Republican Bill Bolling, had originally planned to run for Governor of Virginia in the 2013 gubernatorial election, but withdrew upon the entry of Attorney General Ken Cuccinelli.

On May 18, 2013, a Republican state convention in Richmond nominated minister and conservative activist E.W. Jackson over six others after four ballots. The Democratic primary on June 11, 2013, was won by State Senator Ralph Northam, who defeated Aneesh Chopra, former Chief Technology Officer of the United States. Northam then defeated Jackson by a wide margin in the general election.

As the Senate of Virginia was evenly split between 20 Democrats and 20 Republicans, the lieutenant gubernatorial election effectively decided which party had control of that chamber.

Background
In early 2008, Bolling and then-Attorney General Bob McDonnell struck a deal in which Bolling agreed to run for re-election as lieutenant governor to allow McDonnell to run unopposed for governor in 2009, in exchange for McDonnell's support for Bolling for governor in 2013. The deal was widely known and as such, Bolling was effectively running for governor since 2009, and in April 2010, Bolling filed the necessary paperwork to run in 2013. Virginia Attorney General Ken Cuccinelli, elected alongside McDonnell and Bolling in 2009, stated that he intended to run for re-election as attorney general in 2013, but did not rule out running for governor. In December 2011, Cuccinelli announced to his staff that he would run against Bolling for governor in 2013; the news went public, and in response, Bolling issued a statement accusing Cuccinelli of putting "his own personal ambition ahead of the best interests of the commonwealth and the Republican Party." Cuccinelli's announcement came two days before the annual statewide conference of Virginia Republicans, at which Bolling and his staff expressed being upset with Cuccinelli's decision.

Bolling, who was polling poorly against Cuccinelli, withdrew from the race on November 28, 2012. He cited the Republican Party's decision to move to a nominating convention rather than hold a primary. He ruled out running for another term as lieutenant governor and refused to endorse Cuccinelli.

Republican nomination

The Republican Party chose its nominee at a convention in Richmond. Seven candidates were running, and after four rounds of balloting, E.W. Jackson was chosen as the nominee.

Candidates

Nominated at convention
 E. W. Jackson, pastor, conservative activist, former United States Marine Corps Corporal and candidate for the U.S. Senate in 2012

Defeated at convention
 Jeannemarie Devolites Davis, former state senator
 Scott Lingamfelter, state representative
 Steve Martin, state senator
 Corey Stewart, Chairman of the Prince William Board of County Supervisors
 Susan Stimpson, Chairwoman of the Stafford County Board of Supervisors
 Pete Snyder, venture capitalist and Fox News commentator

Declined
 Bill Bolling, incumbent lieutenant governor
 Keith Fimian, businessman and nominee for Virginia's 11th congressional district in 2008 and 2010
 Jeff McWaters, state senator
 Jamie Radtke, co-founder of the Virginia Tea Party Patriots and candidate for the U.S. Senate in 2012

Democratic primary
The Virginia Democratic primary was held on June 11, 2013. Ralph Northam was chosen as the nominee.

Candidates

Declared
 Aneesh Chopra, former Chief Technology Officer of the United States
 Ralph Northam, State Senator and former United States Army Major

Declined
 Kenneth Cooper Alexander, state senator
 Ward Armstrong, former Minority Leader of the Virginia House of Delegates
 David A. Bowers, Mayor of Roanoke
 Paula Miller, former state representative

Polling

Results

General election

September debate
The two candidates met in a debate held in Arlington on September 24, 2013. The debate was marked by sharp contrasts between the candidates on both issues and style. Northam was the aggressor in the debate, attacking Jackson over his controversial statements and personal history.

In response to repeated attacks from Northam on Jackson's history of controversial statements, Jackson read aloud a section of the Virginia Constitution that differentiates social opinions from one's ability to govern. Jackson said, "I know the difference between what I do [in church] and what I’m required to do here. ... If I’m elected, I’m going to serve all the people of Virginia regardless of what their religious background is. ... I’m not running to be preacher, theologian, bishop, pastor of Virginia. I’m running to be lieutenant governor of Virginia."

Northam spoke at length on abortion, saying regulations and laws on abortion recently passed by the General Assembly represented "an assault on women's reproductive health care," and attacked Jackson for his support of those regulations and laws. Jackson responded simply, "I am unabashedly pro-life. I make no apologies for that."

Jackson said he opposed a Medicaid expansion in Virginia, saying it would saddle Virginia with debt. Northam said he supported the expansion because if Virginia rejected it, the taxes it pays to the federal government would go to other states.

Both candidates sought to speak more personally about themselves. Northam talked about his career in the military and medicine, while Jackson talked about getting through a rough childhood to attend Harvard Law School and eventually entering ministry.

Endorsements

Predictions

Polling

Results

See also
2013 Virginia elections
2013 Virginia gubernatorial election
2013 Virginia Attorney General election
2013 United States gubernatorial elections

References

2013 Virginia elections
2013
2013 United States lieutenant gubernatorial elections